Mashonaland West is a province of Zimbabwe. It has an area of 57,441 km² and a population of approximately 1.5 million (2012). Chinhoyi is the capital of the province.

Districts
Mashonaland West is divided into 7 districts:
 Chegutu
 Hurungwe
 Kariba
 Makonde
 Mhondoro-Ngezi
 Sanyati
 Zvimba

Geography

See also

Provinces of Zimbabwe
Districts of Zimbabwe

References

 
Provinces of Zimbabwe